The Fighting in Pesmes was a military conflict of the Franco-Prussian War, it took place from December 16 to December 18, 1870, it was held in Pesmes, located on the river Ognon between Gray and Dole, France. In this fierce fight, a force of the Prussian's which included injured soldiers, Uhlan's and artillery, defeated the French army at the Ognon River, accomplishing its goal of breaking the bridge over the river. At the same time with this battle, the Prussian army - Germany under the command of General August von Werder had invaded Nuits-Saint-Georges from the hands of French commander, Camille Crémer on December 18, 1870.

On December 16, 1870, a company of the LANDWEHR militia was ordered to arrive at Pesmes with some engineers, in order to destroy the bridge over the river Ognon. Even so, the two French battalions defending the Ognon crossing held up a tenacious resistance, and the Germans were forced to give up their intentions that day. However, on the next day on December 17, the German army made another attempt, with a larger force consisting of 7 companies of the 25th Regiment and a German Uhlan lance cavalry. , along with a battery of heavyweight artillery. The French at Pesmes opened fire on one of the German cavalrymen, however, after the enemy threw a few grenades into the town in response, the French army retreated to the other side of the Ognon River. The German army then advanced to capture Pesmes, and a part of them crossed the Ognon, and engaged the enemy in villages and forests. The French were forced to retreat with some losses. On the afternoon of December 18, 1870, the German outpost at Ognon was attacked by the French. However, the German army was finally able to break the enemy's advance. The French army suffered some losses, including who their commander.

After the fighting, the German army remained in Pesmes for a day. By December 20, 1870, having completed breaking the bridge over the river, the Germans withdrew from their temporary defensive positions.

References

1870 in France
Pesmes
Pesmes
Pesmes
Pesmes
December 1870 events